Okhaldhunga is the headquarters of the Okhaldhunga District in the Sagarmatha Zone of Nepal. At the time of the 1991 Nepal census it had a population of 3761 living in 790 individual households.

Background
The name Okhaldhunga originates from "okhal", the Nepali word for "grinding stone", one of which lies at the district headquarters.

Okhaldhunga is the birthplace of the Nepalese poet, Siddhicharan Shrestha, Okhaldhunga is also known as the "District of Martyrs". It is believed that more than 56 citizens of the area died in the Nepalese struggle for democracy.

Media 
To promote local culture Okhaldhunga has two FM radio stations: Radio Likhu (91.3 MHz) and Ramailo Samudayek Radio (100.6 MHz), both of which are community radio stations.

Gallery

References

External links
UN map of the municipalities of Okhaldhunga District

Populated places in Okhaldhunga District